The 2015 Quicken Loans 400 was a NASCAR Sprint Cup Series race held on June 14, 2015 at Michigan International Speedway in Brooklyn, Michigan. Contested over 138 of the scheduled 200 laps on the 2 mile (3.2 km) D-shaped speedway, it was the 15th race of the 2015 NASCAR Sprint Cup Series season. Kurt Busch won the race, his second of the season, while Dale Earnhardt Jr. and Martin Truex Jr. finished second and third. Matt Kenseth and Joey Logano rounded out the top five.

Kasey Kahne won the pole for the race and led one lap on his way to a 15th-place finish. Kevin Harvick led a race high of 63 laps before a flat tire and rain relegated him to a 29th-place finish. The race had 17 lead changes among eleven different drivers, as well as five caution flag periods for 38 laps. There were three red flag periods for one hour, 33 minutes and 13 seconds.

This was the 27th career victory for Kurt Busch, third at Michigan International Speedway and first at the track for Stewart-Haas Racing. This win moved Busch to eleventh in the points standings. Chevrolet left Michigan with a 66-point lead over Ford in the manufacturer standings.

The Quicken Loans 400 was carried by Fox Sports on the cable/satellite Fox Sports 1 network for the American television audience. The radio broadcast for the race was carried by the Motor Racing Network and Sirius XM NASCAR Radio.

Report

Background

The track is used primarily for NASCAR events. It is sometimes known as a "sister track" to Texas World Speedway, and was used as the basis of Auto Club Speedway. The track is owned by International Speedway Corporation (ISC). Michigan International Speedway is recognized as one of motorsports' premier facilities because of its wide racing surface and high banking (by open-wheel standards; the 18-degree banking is modest by stock car standards).
Michigan is the fastest track in NASCAR due to its wide, sweeping corners and long straightaways; typical qualifying speeds are in excess of 200 MPH (320 km/h) and corner entry speeds are anywhere from  after the 2012 repaving of the track.

Kevin Harvick entered Michigan with a 39-point lead over Martin Truex Jr. following a runner-up finish at Pocono to Truex. Jimmie Johnson entered 78 back. Joey Logano entered 79 back. Dale Earnhardt Jr. entered 94 back.

Entry list
The entry list for the Quicken Loans 400 was released on Tuesday, June 9 at 9:09 a.m. Eastern time. Forty-four cars were entered for the race. All but the No. 21 Wood Brothers Racing Ford driven by Ryan Blaney were entered the week before at Pocono. The only driver swap for this race is the No. 32 Go FAS Racing Ford that was driven by Mike Bliss.

First practice
His teammate Kurt Busch slapped the wall exiting turn 2 with 30 minutes remaining in the session and switched to his backup car. "Went down in there and was a little twitchier when it turned in and then it went full on left," Busch radioed to his team after the hit. "Sorry … it's pretty much ruined." Because this change took place prior to qualifying, he was not required to start the race from the rear of the field. The session was shortened due to rain.

Qualifying

It’s going to be really important. The track is going to change a lot, though, come Sunday, with all the racing going on this weekend and then our practices tomorrow. The track will be a lot different Sunday. So, there will be some passing for sure, but it’s not going to be easy. So, track position will play a big role in being there at the end of the race.” "Kasey [Kahne] put up a little better lap than I did, but it was still a solid run," Kevin Harvick said after qualifying second. “It was a good lap,” said Brad Keselowski after qualifying third. “This is one of our weakness tracks here at Michigan International Speedway. We are working on it and trying to get better. I honestly didn’t think we would qualify this well. We came with some new stuff on the car, which seems to be working. I am proud of everyone at Team Penske, Ford and Roush Yates engines for that.” Brendan Gaughan was the lone driver who failed to qualify for the race. Ryan Blaney qualified fifth for the race. “It's really all you can ask for to be better and better in the three rounds,” Blaney said of the team's qualifying effort. “Everyone did a great job. (Crew chief) Jeremy (Bullins) did a great job of getting us better. It was a good effort for us. We needed it. We're excited about Sunday."

Qualifying results

Practice (post-qualifying)

Second practice

Final practice
Halfway through the session, Denny Hamlin spun out on the front stretch and caused minor damage to the front splitter. The team initially decided to roll out the backup car, but chose to fix the primary car rather than starting from the rear of the race.

Race

First half

Start and rain delays
The race was scheduled to start at 1:16 p.m., but the threat of thunderstorms prompted NASCAR to move the start time up ten minutes. Eventually, the race started eight minutes after one. Kasey Kahne led the field to the green flag, but lost the lead to Carl Edwards on the first lap. He passed him to lead the second lap. Edwards went by him again to lead the third lap. The first caution of the race flew on lap 11 for rain in turns 1 and 2. The race was red flagged on lap 13 for rain. After 59 minutes, the red flag was lifted and the field was moved off pit road. After two laps under caution, rain began to fall again in turn 1. The rain started coming down harder all around the track and the field was brought back down pit road again. The race was red flagged a second time on lap 19. It was lifted after 34 minutes.

The race was set to restart on lap 25, but it was called off after Alex Bowman – who made contact with the wall early in the race – left debris on the backstretch. Eventually, the race restarted on lap 29. The second caution of the race flew on lap 41. It was a scheduled competition caution due to overnight rain. Josh Wise opted not to pit and took the lead. He drove down pit road the next lap and handed the lead to Kevin Harvick. Just as the field was lining up for the restart on lap 44, rain began to pour a third time. The field was brought back down pit road and the race was red flagged for the third time. After 36 minutes, the red flag was lifted and the field rolled off pit road.

Second quarter
The race restarted on lap 52. The third caution of the race flew on lap 53 for a single car wreck on the front stretch. Exiting turn 4, Kyle Busch's car snapped loose, turned up the track and pounded the wall. The SAFER barrier he hit was damaged and required repair.

The race restarted on lap 60. A number of cars began hitting pit road around lap 77. Kevin Harvick surrendered the lead to pit on lap 83 and handed the lead to Matt Kenseth. He pitted on lap 85 and handed the lead to Brad Keselowski. He ducked onto pit road the next lap and gave the lead to Kyle Larson. He pitted on lap 88 and handed the lead to Joey Logano. He ran out of fuel on lap 95 and hit pit road. This gave the lead to Danica Patrick. She pitted on lap 97 and the lead cycled back to teammate Harvick.

Second half

Halfway
Harvick gave up the lead to pit on lap 121 and handed it to Dale Earnhardt Jr. He pitted the next lap and it went to Kenseth. He pitted the next lap and handed it to Keselowski. Harvick stopped a second time for a flat right-front tire. Debris in turn 3 brought out the fourth caution of the race on lap 125. That debris came from Harvick's car. Edwards opted not to pit and assumed the lead with rain just three miles out. The gamble failed and he pitted before the restart.

Finish
Kyle Larson led the field to the restart on lap 130. He too failed on his gamble, pitted for gas three laps later and gave the lead to Kurt Busch. “Yeah, we could see weather coming there off of (Turn) 4 and just praying that it would get here in time for me to stay out and be in the lead when the rain did hit,” Larson said. “Hey, I applaud my guys for trying. We are pretty deep in points so we have to take risks like that to make the Chase. I’m happy with the call, just wish the rain would have come three laps sooner.” The fifth caution of the race flew with 64 laps to go for rain. The field was brought down pit road and the race was red flagged for the fourth time with 62 laps to go. Eventually, NASCAR called the race due to darkness being near and no sign of the weather letting up and Kurt Busch scored his 27th career win and third at Michigan, similar to the rain-shortened Coke Zero 400 last year when Aric Almirola scored his first career win at Daytona.

Post-race

Post-race comments

“(Crew chief) Tony Gibson led these guys through a back-up car, the pit crew was there giving it its best,” Kurt Busch said. “It’s an unbelievable feeling to know what we went through, paced ourselves and found the lead towards the latter part of the race and then the rain came in.” “Yeah, I mean, you just had to wait on the weather to get moved out, wait on them to dry the track,” Earnhardt Jr. said after finishing second. “You know, it didn't give you a whole lot of opportunities to understand your car and know exactly how to adjust your car and what to work on, so we were still dealing with some issues that we wanted to improve when the final shower came.” “We were able to use the strategy to our benefit and come out of here with a top-10 effort and that feels great for this team,” Trevor Bayne said of his season-best finish of ninth. “We have been working hard to get up better results all season and to get this ninth place finish today is a confidence and momentum builder.”

In his weekly Monday appearance on the Sirius XM NASCAR Radio program The Morning Drive, NASCAR Executive Vice-President and Chief Racing Officer Steve O'Donnell explained to Mike Bagley and Pete Pistone the process and reasoning to why the race was called before its scheduled conclusion.

Race results

Race statistics
17 lead changes among 11 different drivers
5 cautions for 38 laps; 3 red flags for 1 hour, 33 minutes, 22 seconds
Time of race: 2 hours, 21 minutes, 55 seconds
Average speed: 
Kurt Busch took home $186,725 in winnings

Race awards
 Coors Light Pole Award: Kasey Kahne (35.645)
 3M Lap Leader: Kevin Harvick (63 laps)
 American Ethanol Green Flag Restart Award: Carl Edwards
 Duralast Brakes "Bake In The Race" Award: Carl Edwards
 Freescale "Wide Open": Kurt Busch
 Ingersoll Rand Power Move: Jamie McMurray (11 positions)
 MAHLE Clevite Engine Builder of the Race: Hendrick Engines, #41
 Mobil 1 Driver of the Race: Matt Kenseth (117.6 driver rating)
 Moog Steering and Suspension Problem Solver of The Race: Paul Menard (crew chief Justin Alexander (0.260))
 NASCAR Sprint Cup Leader Bonus: No winner: rolls over to $120,000 at next event
 Sherwin-Williams Fastest Lap: Carl Edwards (Lap 30, 36.649)
 Sunoco Rookie of The Race: Brett Moffitt

Media

Television
Fox Sports covered their seventh race at Michigan International Speedway and their first since 2006. Mike Joy, Larry McReynolds and two time Michigan winner Darrell Waltrip had the booth to call the race. Jamie Little, Chris Neville and Matt Yocum handled the pit road duties for the television side.

Radio
MRN had the radio call for the race, which was simulcast on Sirius XM NASCAR Radio. Joe Moore, Jeff Striegle and five time Michigan winner Rusty Wallace called the race in the booth when the field was racing down the front stretch. Dave Moody called the race from atop a billboard outside of turn 2 when the field was racing through turns 1 and 2. Mike Bagley called the race from a platform outside turn 4 when the field was racing through turns 3 and 4. Alex Hayden, Winston Kelley and Steve Post worked pit road for MRN.

Standings after the race

Drivers' Championship standings

Manufacturers' Championship standings

Note: Only the first sixteen positions are included for the driver standings.

Note

References

Quicken Loans 400
Quicken Loans 400
NASCAR races at Michigan International Speedway